Neill William Collins (born 2 September 1983) is a Scottish football manager and former player who is the head coach of USL Championship side Tampa Bay Rowdies.

He is a former Scotland U21 and Scotland B international who played as a centre-back. He started his playing career with Queen's Park before moving to Dumbarton. A transfer to English side Sunderland followed in 2004 but he failed to establish himself in the first team during his three-year spell on Wearside. After loan moves to Hartlepool United and Sheffield United he was loaned to Wolverhampton Wanderers, where he became a first team regular and signed a permanent deal in 2007. Following Wolves' promotion to the Premier League he fell out of favour and moved on loan again, this time to Preston North End, but although they signed him permanently in 2010, he was never a regular and quickly moved to Leeds United, with whom he won promotion to the Championship in 2010. After losing his place the following season Collins returned to Sheffield United, one of his former loan clubs, for whom he made over 100 appearances. He lost his first team place in the 2014–15 season and joined Port Vale on loan in March 2015. He moved to America in March 2016 to play for the Tampa Bay Rowdies. By the end of his 18-year playing career he had scored 35 goals in 583 league and cup appearances.

He took his first post in management in May 2018 when he transitioned from player to head coach at the Tampa Bay Rowdies. The 2021 season would prove highly successful as he won two USL Championship Coach of the Month awards, as well as the Coach of the Year award, as his side won the Eastern Conference and went on to finish as runners-up in the playoffs.

Club career

Queen's Park
Collins was born in Troon, Scotland. He was associated with Kilmarnock's youth academy, the team he supported as a boy, before being released at the age of 14. He began his career with Scottish amateur club, Queen's Park, making his first-team debut in a 2–0 win at Stirling Albion on 24 March 2001. He went on to make four appearances in the 2000–01 season as John McCormack's Spiders were relegated from the Second Division to the Third Division. He played 31 games as Queen's Park finished bottom of the Scottish Football League in 2001–02. During this time he worked at a Safeway supermarket.

Dumbarton
Collins earned a move to newly promoted Second Division club Dumbarton in July 2002. During his stay at the Strathclyde Homes Stadium, Collins became popular with the fans and had a spell as captain and was key to Paul Martin's Sons battle to stay in the Second Division in 2002–03. He then featured 34 times as Dumbarton finished two points outside the promotion places in 2003–04 under Brian Fairley's stewardship. During his time there he had trials with Falkirk, Hibernian, Rangers and Charlton Athletic. During his time in Scotland he also completed a BA 'Sport in the Community' degree at the University of Strathclyde.

Sunderland
Collins was signed by Sunderland manager Mick McCarthy in August 2004 for a fee of £25,000. Three months later he signed a new contract to keep him at the Stadium of Light until 2007. He made 11 appearances during the 2004–05 season as the club won promotion to the Premier League as champions of the Championship.

He never appeared in the top-flight for the Black Cats after Alan Stubbs was signed, and was instead loaned out to League One side Hartlepool United in August 2005. He made 25 appearances for Martin Scott's Pools during his stay at Victoria Park. He was loaned out to Neil Warnock's Championship promotion hopefuls Sheffield United in February 2006. The Blades succeeded in winning promotion in 2005–06, though Collins featured in just two games at Bramall Lane.

With Sunderland back in the Championship in 2006–07, Collins was forced to play in the unfamiliar role of right-back after injuries to teammates Stephen Wright and Nyron Nosworthy. He was a regular under Mick McCarthy, but when McCarthy left the job, Collins was dropped by replacement manager Roy Keane despite Collins feeling he'd performed well.

Wolves
Collins was reunited with his former boss Mick McCarthy at Wolverhampton Wanderers after joining the club on loan in November 2006. The discussion of his loan deal was the first time that Roy Keane and McCarthy had spoken to each other since the Saipan incident in 2002. After his loan expired, he joined Wolves permanently in January 2007 for a fee of £150,000. He was a regular starter for the rest of the 2006–07 season as the club reached the Championship play-offs.

The 2007–08 season saw Wolves miss out on the play-offs on goal difference with Collins making 42 appearances. Collins started 2008–09 strongly with Wolves but was left out of the first team with the loan arrival of Michael Mancienne from Chelsea. When Mancienne returned to Chelsea in the New Year, Collins returned to the side, partnering Richard Stearman. He contributed several important goals during this period, but was soon ousted from the side again after receiving a red card for dissent at Reading and following the addition of Scottish international Christophe Berra. He remained out of the side for the remainder of the season as the club were promoted to the Premier League as champions, and was transfer listed in July 2009.

Preston North End
In September 2009, Collins was loaned out to Championship side Preston North End, a move made permanent when he signed a three-and-a-half-year deal for an undisclosed fee in January 2010. The deal was finalised after manager Alan Irvine left the club, and the defender lost his place in the side under new manager Darren Ferguson.

Leeds United
In March 2010, Collins moved to League One side Leeds United on loan for the rest of the 2009–10 season as a replacement for the injured Patrick Kisnorbo. He played an instrumental part as Leeds were promoted to the Championship after finishing in second place in League One. He signed a three-year deal with Leeds in July 2010 for an undisclosed fee.

He started the 2010–11 season as one of Leeds' first choice defenders, due to Patrick Kisnorbo still being out with a long term injury. After some indifferent performances early on in the season, Collins scored an own goal in Leeds' 5–2 defeat by Barnsley, and was dropped to the bench by manager Simon Grayson at the end of October.

Sheffield United

Collins signed a two-and-a-half-year deal with Championship side Sheffield United after being signed by Micky Adams for an undisclosed fee in January 2011. He made his debut in a 3–0 defeat to Ipswich Town at Portman Road on 5 February. He was a regular in defence for the remainder of the 2010–11 season, playing 14 games, but struggled as the team undertook an ultimately unsuccessful battle against relegation; he later said that "ill discipline was rife at the club on and off the pitch" and "I tried to be like Roy of the Rovers and Terry Butcher rolled into one and it didn't go well".

Now in League One and under the stewardship of Danny Wilson, the 2011–12 campaign saw Collins establish an effective defensive partnership with fellow centre-back Harry Maguire, and he was awarded supporters Player of the Month for September 2011. He scored his first goal for the Blades in February 2012, in a 1–0 victory over Yorkshire rivals Huddersfield Town at the Galpharm Stadium. Collins remained a mainstay of the defence but United missed out on automatic promotion by three points to city rivals Sheffield Wednesday, then lost to Huddersfield in the play-off final at Wembley Stadium; the match ended in a 0–0 draw, and though Collins converted his penalty his team lost the shoot-out 8–7.

With the club still in League One, Collins remained as first choice in central defence alongside Maguire, captaining the side during Michael Doyle's absence. During the first half of the 2012–13 season Collins began to score regularly, netting five times by the start of December as United challenged for automatic promotion. In November he extended his current contract by a further two years until 2015 with the option of another year. His good form was halted when he fractured his cheekbone during a game against Scunthorpe United at the end of December, an injury that ruled him out of action for two months. He made 45 appearances across the campaign as United recorded a club record 21 clean sheets; however they could only reach the play-off semi-finals.

He scored two goals in 55 appearances in the 2013–14 season and was named on the Football League team of the week after helping United to consecutive 1–0 victories away at Colchester United and Milton Keynes Dons as part of a total run of 450 minutes of League One football that the team went without conceding a goal.

He lost his place in the United first team early in the 2014–15 season, and dropped out of manager Nigel Clough's first team plans having failed to make an appearance past October. Despite this he vowed to remain at the club, saying he enjoyed a connection with the club. He joined League One rivals Port Vale on loan until the end of the season on 26 March 2015.

Following Nigel Clough's departure as manager, Collins was restored to the first team under new boss Nigel Adkins for the 2015–16 season. He was named in the Football League team of the week after scoring a headed goal in a 2–0 victory at Swindon Town, winning praise for his centre-back partnership with David Edgar.

Tampa Bay Rowdies
On 11 March 2016, Collins had his contract with Sheffield United cancelled by mutual consent to allow him to sign a two-year contract with the North American Soccer League's Tampa Bay Rowdies. Head coach Stuart Campbell led the Rowdies to a ninth-place finish in the combined 2016 table. He featured 33 times in the 2017 campaign as the Rowdies finished third in the United Soccer League.

International career
Collins won seven caps at Scotland under-21 level. On 20 November 2007, he played for Scotland B in a 1–1 draw with Republic of Ireland B at the Excelsior Stadium; he came on as a substitute for Darren Dods at half-time.

Coaching career
On 18 May 2018, Collins was promoted to manager at the Tampa Bay Rowdies after he impressed chairman Bill Edwards with his intensity and work ethic. The Rowdies went on to finish the 2018 season 12th in the USL Eastern Conference table under difficult circumstances, with Collins commenting that “We had players retiring for a variety of reasons, guys getting serious injuries, other off-field problems, it was one thing after another." They finished fifth in the 2019 season, before losing 2–1 to Louisville City FC in the Conference quarter-finals. The Rowdies finished top of the table in the 2020 season, which was brought to an early end and decided on points per game due to the COVID-19 pandemic in the United States. The play-offs continued and Tampa made it to the Championship final against Phoenix Rising FC. However the final was cancelled the day before it was due to be played because several Tampa Bay Rowdies players and staff tested positive for COVID-19; the championship would not be awarded.

Collins was named as USL Championship Coach of the Year after his team achieved 23 wins to top the Eastern Conference in the 2021 regular season. He was also named as Coach of the Month for April / May and September, having achieved 100% win records in both time periods and setting a league record of 891 minutes without conceding a goal. In the playoffs, Tampa defeated FC Tulsa, Birmingham Legion FC and Louisville City FC, before falling to a 3–1 defeat to Orange County SC in the final.

Style of play
Writing in The Guardian in 2007, Steve Claridge compared Collins to Tony Adams, describing him as "strong and robust" with good positional and organisation skills. Collins described heading as the strongest part of his game.

Career statistics

Honours

Player
Sunderland
EFL Championship: 2004–05

Wolverhampton Wanderers
EFL Championship: 2008–09

Leeds United
EFL League One second-place promotion: 2009–10

Manager
Individual
USL Championship Coach of the Month: April / May 2021, September 2021
USL Championship Coach of the Year: 2021

Tampa Bay Rowdies
USL Championship Eastern Conference: 2021
USL Championship Playoff runner-up: 2021

References

1983 births
Living people
People from Troon
Footballers from South Ayrshire
Scottish footballers
Scotland under-21 international footballers
Scotland B international footballers
Association football defenders
Kilmarnock F.C. players
Queen's Park F.C. players
Dumbarton F.C. players
Sunderland A.F.C. players
Wolverhampton Wanderers F.C. players
Hartlepool United F.C. players
Sheffield United F.C. players
Leeds United F.C. players
Preston North End F.C. players
Port Vale F.C. players
Scottish expatriate footballers
Expatriate soccer players in the United States
Tampa Bay Rowdies players
Scottish Football League players
English Football League players
North American Soccer League players
Scottish football managers
Expatriate soccer managers in the United States
Tampa Bay Rowdies coaches
USL Championship coaches
Alumni of the University of Strathclyde
USL Championship players
Scottish expatriate sportspeople in the United States